The 1958 Boston College Eagles football team represented Boston College as an independent during the 1958 NCAA University Division football season. In its eighth season under head coach Mike Holovak, the team compiled a 7–3 record and outscored opponents by a total of 229 to 127.

The team allowed opponents an average of 194.2 yards of total offense per game (106.0 rushing yards and 88.2 passing yards). The defense also recovered 24 fumbles and gave up only 91 first downs in 10 games. All three figures remain Boston College season records.

The team's statistical leaders included quarterback Don Allard with 691 passing yards, Jim Duggan with 489 rushing yards, end Jim Colclough with 462 receiving yards, and end Jack Flanagan with 36 points scored. 

Jack Flanagan also received the Thomas F. Scanlan Memorial Trophy as the senior player outstanding in scholarship, leadership, and athletic ability. Flanagan was also named to the first team of the All-New England football team. Tackle Steve Bennett was named to the second team.

Five members of the team went on to play in the National Football League or American Football League: Don Allard, Jim Colclough,
Larry Eisenhauer, Alan Miller, and Ross O'Hanley.

The team played its home games at Alumni Stadium in Chestnut Hill, Massachusetts.

Schedule

References

Boston College
Boston College Eagles football seasons
Boston College Eagles football
1950s in Boston